Merhavia (lit. "Space of God") is a moshav in northern Israel. Founded in 1911, it was the first modern Jewish settlement in the Jezreel Valley.

Etymology
The name Merhavia is derived from the Book of Psalms .
Out of my straits I called upon the LORD; He answered me with great enlargement. In the metaphorical sense: "God set me free" - the experience of the Jews immigrating to the Land of Israel and achieving a new homeland without the straits of persecution.

History

Co-operative
The village was established as the Co-operative in Merhavia, a co-operative farm, at the beginning of 1911, based on the ideas of Franz Oppenheimer. The founders had arrived in the area in 1910 and consisted of members of Kvutzat Kibush and workers of the Second Aliyah. It was supposed to operate as a co-operative farm with differential wages, and was founded with the assistance of Arthur Ruppin, Yehoshua Hankin, the Anglo-Palestine Bank and Eliyahu Blumenfeld. Alexander Baerwald designed and built the first solid buildings and the road net with a central square in 1915.

Moshav
In 1922 it was converted to a moshav ovdim after being joined by Polish-Jewish immigrants and residents of Tel Aviv who wanted to work in agriculture. According to a census conducted in the same year by the British Mandate authorities, the settlement had a population of 135 Jews.

In 1929 a kibbutz, also by the name of Merhavia, was established next to the moshav.

Gallery

Notable residents
Henry Einspruch (1892–1977), a Galician-born Jew who converted to Lutheranism, becoming a Messianic missionary affiliated with the Hebrew Christian movement, best known for translating the Christian New Testament into Yiddish.

References

External links

Moshavim
Populated places established in 1911
1911 establishments in the Ottoman Empire
Populated places in Northern District (Israel)
Polish-Jewish culture in Israel